Jovica Lakić (Serbian Cyrillic: Јовица Лакић; born September 4, 1974) is a retired Serbian professional footballer.

During his career he played for the Serbian clubs OFK Kikinda, FK Beograd, FK Milicionar, FK Obilić and FK Mladost Apatin and the Russian clubs FC Torpedo Moscow and FC Torpedo-ZIL Moscow.

References

External links
 Profile and stats at Srbijafudbal. 
 

1974 births
Living people
Sportspeople from Kikinda
Serbian footballers
Serbian expatriate footballers
OFK Kikinda players
FK Obilić players
FK Mladost Apatin players
FC Torpedo Moscow players
FC Moscow players
Russian Premier League players
Expatriate footballers in Russia
Association football midfielders